James Kennedy (31 January 1934 – 2 December 2003) was a Scottish footballer who played mainly as a left-back for Celtic, Greenock Morton and Scotland.

His career with Celtic spanned a period of underachievement for the club, whereby a talented group of individuals did not function effectively enough as a team to win trophies. Nonetheless Kennedy – who featured on the losing side in the 1963 Scottish Cup Final and the 1964 Scottish League Cup Final, having been afflicted with appendicitis prior to the replay of the 1961 Scottish Cup Final which Celtic also eventually lost – was latterly recognised by the national team, although by the time he gained his six caps for Scotland (aged 30/31) playing in the left back role he occupied for most of his time, he had been displaced from that position at Celtic by the young Tommy Gemmell and was instead being selected at left half.

References

External links

1934 births
2003 deaths
Association football fullbacks
People from Johnstone
Scottish footballers
Celtic F.C. players
Greenock Morton F.C. players
Scotland international footballers
Scottish Football League players
Scottish Football League representative players
Footballers from Renfrewshire
Duntocher Hibernian F.C. players
Scottish Junior Football Association players